La strada di casa is an Italian RAI TV series directed by Riccardo Donna.

Plot
Fausto Morra is a 50-year old family man, owner of a food-processing plant in Piedmont, Cascina Riva, consisting of hundreds of animals and acres of land. After a car accident, Fausto goes into a coma, waking up after 5 years. During that period, everything has changed: his wife Gloria married his best friend Michele and his plant is on the verge of bankruptcy. Slowly regaining his memories, Fausto realises that his past is vanishing, but he needs to discover the truth hiding behind his own affairs to get his life back. In particular, the disappearance of Paolo Ghilardi, a veterinarian who had accused Fausto of selling counterfeit meat, the night of his accident is shrouded in mystery. Once the case is solved, another mystery surrounds Fausto's family: his son Lorenzo's girlfriend Irene Ghilardi disappears the day before their marriage.

Cast
 Alessio Boni as Fausto Morra: founder of Cascina Morra, charismatic man and authoritarian father.
 Lucrezia Lante della Rovere as Gloria: Fausto's wife and mother of four children, strong woman able to face her though life, focused to hold her family together.
 Thomas Trabacchi as Michele: Fausto's best friend, agronomist at Cascina Morra.
 Sergio Rubini as Ernesto Baldoni: Paolo Ghilardi's boss, initially he accuses Fausto of Ghilardi's death, then he helps him to look for Irene Ghilardi, whom he considers as his own child.
 Eugenio Franceschini as Lorenzo Morra: dreamer and idealist, he finds his way opening a brewery.
 Christiane Filangieri as Veronica Nardi: beautiful woman in a relationship with Ernesto and with a passion for catering industry.

Episodes

References

Italian television series
Television shows set in Italy